Turkey Practical Shooting Association, Tuskish Türkiyenin Pratik Atış Yarışma, is the Turkish association for practical shooting under the International Practical Shooting Confederation.

External links 
 Official homepage of the Turkey Practical Shooting Association

References 

Regions of the International Practical Shooting Confederation
Sports organizations of Turkey